Beatrice Berti (born 12 January 1996) is an Italian volleyball player for the Italian national team.

Career 
She participated at the 2015 FIVB Volleyball Women's U20 World Championship, and the 2018 FIVB Volleyball Women's Nations League.

References

External links 
 FIVB profile
 http://u23.women.2015.volleyball.fivb.com/en/competition/teams/ita-italy/players/beatrice-berti?id=45588
 http://www.legavolleyfemminile.it/?page_id=194&idat=BER-BEA-96

1996 births
Living people
Italian women's volleyball players
Universiade medalists in volleyball
Universiade silver medalists for Italy
Competitors at the 2018 Mediterranean Games
Medalists at the 2019 Summer Universiade
Mediterranean Games competitors for Italy